Frisange is a commune and town in southern Luxembourg. It is part of the canton of Esch-sur-Alzette.

, the town of Frisange, which lies in the north of the commune, has a population of 1,302.  Other towns within the commune include Aspelt and Hellange.

Population

Twin towns — sister cities

Frisange is twinned with:
  Saint-Julien-de-Coppel, France

References

External links
 

 
Communes in Esch-sur-Alzette (canton)
Towns in Luxembourg